Julie Battilana is a scholar, educator, and advisor in the areas of social innovation and social change at Harvard University.
She is the Joseph C. Wilson Professor of Business Administration at Harvard Business School and the Alan L. Gleitsman Professor of Social Innovation at the Harvard Kennedy School.

She is the founder and faculty chair of the Social Innovation and Change Initiative at the Harvard Kennedy School.

Education
Battilana earned a BA in sociology and economics, an MA in political sociology, and an MSc in organizational sociology and public policy from École Normale Supérieure de Cachan in France.

She also holds a degree from HEC School of Management, and a joint PhD in organizational behavior from INSEAD and in management and economics from École Normale Supérieure de Cachan.

Her dissertation was about “The role of individuals in institutional change: When individuals act as institutional entrepreneurs”

Research
Battilana studies the politics of change in organizations and in society. Her recent body of research focuses on social change and hybrid organizations that pursue a social mission while engaging in commercial activities to sustain their operations. She examines the factors that enable these organizations to achieve high levels of social and environmental performance alongside financial performance.

Her research has been featured in publications like Businessweek, Forbes, Huffington Post, Harvard Business Review, and Stanford Social Innovation Review. She has been a regular contributor to the French newspaper, Le Monde.

Books

Battilana is the coauthor of Power, for All: How it Works and Why it's Everyone's Business, (Simon & Schuster, 2021) written with Tiziana Casciaro (Rotman School of Management, University of Toronto). Building on their combined decades of teaching and research, Power, for All offers an analysis of power that transcends the individual, the organizational and the societal levels.  Given how rich and complex the concept of power is, Battilana and Casciaro researched across disciplines including sociology, social and evolutionary psychology, management, political science, economics, law, history, and philosophy. By lifting the veil on power, revealing what it is, and how it works, Battilana and Casciaro aim to unleash the potential for all to build and use power to effect change at home, at work, and in society.

Battilana is also the co-author of Le Manifeste Travail: démocratiser, Démarchandiser, dépolluer (Le Seuil, 2020) to be published in English by University of Chicago Press in 2022.

Academic publications

Battilana has published many academic articles in the Academy of Management Annals, Academy of Management Journal, Harvard Business Review, Journal of Business Ethics, Leadership Quarterly, Management Science, Organization, Organization Science, Organization Studies, Management, Research in Organizational Behavior, Stanford Social Innovation Review, and Strategic Organization.

Practitioner materials
Battilana has also produced multiple articles for practitioners in outlets such as the Harvard Business Review and the Stanford Social Innovation Review. In "Should you agitate, innovate or orchestrate?" Battilana develops a framework for understanding the roles you can play in a movement for social change. In "The Network Secrets of Great Change Agents" Battilana highlights the key factors of success in implementing change.

In the Dual Purpose Playbook she aims to help managers understand how companies can sustainably pursue both financial and social objectives.

Democratizing Work Initiative
In a May 2020 op-ed published in 43 newspapers of 36 countries, Battilana, alongside Isabelle Ferreras and Dominique Méda, issued an urgent plea. The Covid-19 crisis magnified the massive inequalities in wealth and access to care. Battilana and her co-authors stress that we must democratize the workplace to involve employees in the government of their workplace, decommodify parts of the economy that cannot just be managed by market forces, and remediate the environment.
 This call to action was signed by more than 6,700 scholars across the globe (as of May 2021), and led to the launch of the website democratizingwork.org.

Honors and awards
Battilana has received multiple mentoring, teaching and academic awards.

In 2019, Battilana was the recipient of the Decade Award from the Academy of Management Annals for her article “How Actors Change Institutions: Towards a Theory of Institutional Entrepreneurship”.

She was made Chevalier dans l’Ordre des Palmes Académiques in 2019.

Battilana was named as a 2019 social innovation thought leader by the Schwab Foundation for Social Entrepreneurship. This awards recognizes experts shaping the evolution of social innovation.

Teaching

Battilana has been teaching, since 2010, the Power and Influence course at the Harvard Business School.

She taught the Leadership and Organisational Behavior course from 2006 to 2010. In addition, since joining Harvard University, Battilana has elaborated an important number of teaching cases that are used in colleges and universities

References

External links

Living people
Harvard Business School faculty
French economists
French women economists
French sociologists
French women sociologists
American economists
American women economists
Place of birth missing (living people)
Harvard Kennedy School faculty
École Normale Supérieure alumni
1977 births
21st-century American women